Penicillium angustiporcatum is a fungus species of the genus of Penicillium.

See also
List of Penicillium species

References

angustiporcatum
Fungi described in 1983